Tim Möller (born 19 March 1999) is a German professional footballer who plays as a defender for SV Lippstadt.

References

External links
 

1999 births
Living people
Sportspeople from Osnabrück
Footballers from Lower Saxony
German footballers
Association football defenders
VfL Osnabrück players
Sportfreunde Lotte players
SV Lippstadt 08 players
2. Bundesliga players
3. Liga players
Regionalliga players